The Parabrotulidae, the false brotulas, are a small family of bathypelagic cusk eels that currently contains two genera. The species in this family are known from the northwest Pacific Ocean and the northeast Atlantic Ocean.

References